Perappadi is a village in the Kumbakonam taluk of Thanjavur district, Tamil Nadu, India.

Demographics 
At the 2011 census, Perappadi had a population of 1,500 (752 males and 748 females). The sex ratio was 995. The literacy rate was 75.85%.

References 
 

Villages in Thanjavur district